Dalibor Šilić (born 23 January 1979) is a Bosnian retired professional footballer who played as a midfielder.

Club career
Born in Konjic, SFR Yugoslavia, present day Bosnia and Herzegovina, Šilić started playing football in the youth teams of Turbina Jablanica and Zrinjski Mostar, before getting called up to the first team of Zrinjski in 1998. In 1999, he joined Brotnjo, with whom he won the 1999–2000 First League of Bosnia and Herzegovina. In 2001, Šilić left Brotnjo to join Slovenian PrvaLiga club Maribor, but shortly after left the club. In January 2002, he signed with Željezničar, where he won the Bosnian Premier League in the 2001–02 season and the Bosnian Cup in the 2002–03 season.

Šilić then joined Široki Brijeg in the summer of 2003, where he would eventually go on to play 10 years for the club, making over 260 league appearances and scoring over 50 league goals, winning the league title 2 times and the cup also 2 times. In December 2013, he finished his playing career at Široki Brijeg at the age of 34.

International career
Šilić made his debut for Bosnia and Herzegovina in a June 2001 Merdeka Tournament match against Slovakia and has earned a total of 9 caps (2 unofficial), scoring no goals. His final international was an October 2006 European Championship qualification match against Greece.

Post-playing career
After retiring, Šilić right away became the Sporting director of Široki Brijeg on 20 December 2013. After over seven years, on 12 January 2021, he unexpectedly resigned from the position.

Honours

Player
Brotnjo
First League of Bosnia and Herzegovina: 1999–00

Željezničar
Bosnian Premier League: 2001–02
Bosnian Cup: 2002–03

Široki Brijeg
Bosnian Premier League: 2003–04, 2005–06
Bosnian Cup: 2006–07, 2012–13

See also
List of NK Maribor players
List of FK Željezničar Sarajevo players

References

External links
Dalibor Šilić profile at weltfussball.de

1979 births
Living people
People from Konjic
Croats of Bosnia and Herzegovina
Association football midfielders
Bosnia and Herzegovina footballers
Bosnia and Herzegovina international footballers
HŠK Zrinjski Mostar players
NK Brotnjo players
NK Maribor players
FK Željezničar Sarajevo players
NK Široki Brijeg players
Premier League of Bosnia and Herzegovina players
Slovenian PrvaLiga players
Bosnia and Herzegovina expatriate footballers
Expatriate footballers in Slovenia
Bosnia and Herzegovina expatriate sportspeople in Slovenia